Real-time enterprise (commonly abbreviated to RTE) is a concept in business systems design focused on ensuring organisational responsiveness that was popularised in the first decade of the 21st century. It is also referred to as on-demand enterprise. Such an enterprise must be able to fulfill orders as soon as they are needed, and current information is available within a company at all times. This is achieved through the use of integrated systems including ERP, CRM and SCM.

Though not particularly well defined, generally accepted goals of an RTE include:
Reduced response times for partners and customers
Increased transparency, for example sharing or reporting information across an enterprise instead of keeping it within individual departments
Increased automation, including communications, accounting, supply chains and reporting
Increased competitiveness
Reduced costs

See also
Business process management (BPM)
Complex event processing (CEP)
Enterprise resource planning (ERP)
Customer relationship management (CRM)
Supply chain management (SCM)

References

External links
Gartner
Dawn of the real-time enterprise at InfoWorld
White Paper on Real Time Enterprises by Vinod Khosla & Murugan Pal

Business process management